The Comstock Tract Buildings of Syracuse University are a set of buildings that were listed on the National Register of Historic Places in 1980.

The name assigned in the listing was "Syracuse University-Comstock Tract Buildings".  Included in the registration are 15 buildings, all located on the original Syracuse University campus, a tract of land originally donated by George F. Comstock. The buildings include what has been known as the "Old Row".

 Archbold Gymnasium (1907)
 Bowne Hall (1907)
 Carnegie Library (1907)
 Crouse College (1888-89) (separately listed on the NRHP in 1974)
 Hendricks Chapel (1933)
 Hall of Languages (1873) (separately listed on the NRHP in 1973)
 Holden Observatory (1887)
 Maxwell Hall (1937)
 Lyman C. Smith Hall (1902)
 Lyman Hall of Natural History (1907)
 Machinery Hall (1907)
 Sims Hall (1907)
 Slocum Hall (1919)
 Steele Hall (1898)
 Tolley Administration Building (1889)

Gallery

See also
List of Registered Historic Places in Onondaga County, New York
List of Syracuse University buildings

References

External links

 Syracuse University Buildings Archive list

Comstock Tract Buildings
Comstock Tract Buildings
Historic districts in Onondaga County, New York
University and college buildings on the National Register of Historic Places in New York (state)
National Register of Historic Places in Syracuse, New York
Historic districts on the National Register of Historic Places in New York (state)